100 Years is an upcoming experimental science fiction film written by John Malkovich and directed by Robert Rodriguez. Advertised in 2015 with the tagline "The Movie You Will Never See", it is due to be released on November 18, 2115.  The film stars an international ensemble, with American actor John Malkovich, Taiwanese actress Shuya Chang, and Chilean actor Marko Zaror.

100 Years is apparently a short film. Rodriguez stated in a 2019 interview:

Cast
While the details of the film have been kept highly secret, the names and roles of three actors have been released: 
 John Malkovich as the male protagonist
 Shuya Chang as the female protagonist
 Marko Zaror as the antagonist

Production
Malkovich and Rodriguez announced in November 2015 that they had teamed with Louis XIII Cognac, owned by Rémy Martin, to create a film inspired by the hundred years it takes to make a bottle of Louis XIII. Although the film's plot remains a complete secret, on November 18, 2015, Malkovich and Rodriguez released three teaser trailers: Retro, Nature, and Future.

Release
Pending release, the film is being kept in a high-tech safe behind bulletproof glass that will open automatically on November 18, 2115, the day of the film's premiere. One thousand guests from around the world, including Malkovich and Rodriguez, have received a pair of invitation tickets made of metal for the premiere, which they can hand down to their descendants. The safe in which 100 Years is kept was showcased at the 2016 Cannes Film Festival and various other cities before being returned to Cognac, France and the Louis XIII cellars.

Related
A song, "100 Years", is said by Louis XIII Cognac to have been composed for them by Pharrell Williams and performed live, once, at a private party. Louis XIII Cognac has promised that a recording of the song will be issued in 2117.

References

External links

Films directed by Robert Rodriguez
English-language French films
Upcoming films
2115 films
French science fiction films
Time capsules